Camp Greylock is a boys' summer camp located in Becket, Massachusetts, United States.  The land was purchased in the fall of 1915, and its opening summer was 1916.  Its founders were three brothers, George, Gabriel ("Doc"), and Lou Mason.  It is currently the oldest continuously operating, private, all-boys' summer camp in Massachusetts.

Notable campers and staff
Notable campers and staff of Camp Greylock include:
Stephen Albert, composer and Pulitzer Prize winner
Jacob M. Appel, writer and playwright 
Eliot Asinof, author 
Alistair Burt, member of Parliament
Sam Coslow, composer  
R.J. Cutler, filmmaker, documentarian, television producer and theater director
Robert Evans, movie producer
Peter Falk, actor 
Douglas Feith, Undersecretary of Defense for Policy for United States President George W. Bush
Lawrence Frank, NBA Basketball Coach and former head coach of the Nets & Pistons
Michael Gordon, stage actor; stage and film director
Peter Grosz, comedian 
David Hallyday, singer and automobile car racer 
Lawrence Halprin, architect 
Joseph Hirsch, painter  
Nat Holman, Basketball Hall of Fame player and coach
Walter Hoving, businessman 
Conrad Janis, actor 
Julian Koenig, advertiser
Eric Ladin, actor 
Edward Lampert, businessman and chairman of Sears Holding Corporation
Lewis Lehrman, historian, author, and gubernatorial candidate
Alan Jay Lerner, Broadway lyricist
Fredric Lieberman, author and musicologist
Josh Malina, actor 
Stanley Marcus, businessman 
Swede Masin, legendary high school and college athlete, and subject of a Phillip Roth novel
Billy Mills, Olympic gold medalist
James Newman, actor 
Ron Perelman, businessman 
Marc E. Platt,  film, television and theatre producer
George R. Roberts, businessman 
Darren Rovell, broadcaster 
Lionel Stander,  actor in films, radio, theater and television; Golden Globe award winner
Julian Steward, anthropologist and developer of theories of cultural ecology and cultural change
Jonathan Tisch, businessman
Michael Weiner, Executive Director of the Major League Baseball Players Association
Bruce Weitz, actor 
Stuart Weitzman, shoe designer 
David L. Wolper,  television and film producer, Academy Award winner

References

External links
Camp Greylock official website

1916 establishments in Massachusetts
Greylock
Buildings and structures in Berkshire County, Massachusetts